Richard Todd Reynolds (born November 3, 1966 in Norwalk, Connecticut) is a former American pair skater who competed with partner Karen Courtland. The pair won the bronze medal at the United States Figure Skating Championships in 1993 and 1994 and finished 14th at the 1994 Winter Olympic Games.

Earlier in his career, Reynolds skated with Katie Wood.

Results
(pairs with Karen Courtland)

References
Sports-Reference.com

1966 births
American male pair skaters
Olympic figure skaters of the United States
Figure skaters at the 1994 Winter Olympics
Living people
20th-century American people
21st-century American people